The Birmingham Children's Theatre, the professional resident theatre company at the Birmingham–Jefferson Convention Complex in Birmingham, Alabama, is a professional theatres producing live theatre for young audiences. Founded in 1947, the theatre stages eight productions per year, both in-house on two stages and on the road with the Theater-in-Motion tour.

The theatre's Wee Folks section are plays based on familiar fictional stories known to little children. Its Mainstage section aims at older children under age thirteen. A 501(c)(3) non-profit organization, Birmingham Children's Theatre performs for over 160,000 students each year.

External links

Theatre companies in Alabama
Performing groups established in 1947
Culture of Birmingham, Alabama
Children's theatre
Theatres in Alabama
Tourist attractions in Birmingham, Alabama